David Gary Holdsworth (born 8 November 1968) is an English former professional footballer turned manager.

As a player, he was a defender who played between 1986 and 2005 for Watford, Sheffield United, Birmingham City, Walsall, Bolton Wanderers and Gretna. In 2008, he moved into management and has since been in charge of Ilkeston Town, Mansfield Town, Lincoln City and Goole.

Playing career

Watford
Holdsworth started his career at Watford in the mid-1980s, going on to make more than 250 league appearances for the club. At Watford he played alongside his brother Dean Holdsworth.

Sheffield United
In October 1996, he left Watford for a new challenge at Sheffield United. In his first season, he helped United to the 1997 Football League First Division play-off Final but they were defeated by Crystal Palace. He also helped them to the 1997–98 FA Cup semi final at Old Trafford where they were defeated by Newcastle United. In the quarterfinal replay against Coventry City, United found themselves 1–0 down at Bramall Lane with two minutes left. Holdsworth popped up to equalise from a corner, sending the game to extra time and then penalties, which United went on to win.

Birmingham City
In March 1999 Holdsworth transferred to Birmingham City. He helped Birmingham to the playoffs at the end of that season where they faced his former club Watford. However Holdsworth was sent off as they lost on penalties. He spent three full seasons there, helping them to the 2001 League Cup Final in which he was an unused substitute in the defeat to Liverpool.

In January 2002 he went on loan to Walsall. At Walsall he scored once against Coventry but was sent off twice in 3–0 defeats to Sheffield Wednesday and Wolves.

Later career
After being released by Birmingham in 2002, he joined Bolton Wanderers on a free transfer where he played alongside his brother Dean again. However, he only made one appearance for the Trotters: in a League Cup defeat to Bury (David started and his brother Dean came on as a substitute). Shortly afterwards he joined Scarborough in the Football Conference and then Scottish club Gretna where he retired. Whilst at Gretna he scored once, his goal coming in the Scottish Cup against Dumbarton.

International career
He was capped once for England at Under-21 level.

Managerial career
After retiring from playing he became reserve team manager at Gretna, where he was appointed director of youth development in May 2006,
but was sacked in a cost-cutting exercise a few months later. On 20 May 2008, Holdsworth was appointed to his first managerial role, taking over at Northern Premier League Premier Division side Ilkeston Town from Nigel Jemson, the first appointment of new owner Check Whyte.

On 29 December 2008, Holdsworth was appointed manager of Conference National club Mansfield Town having led Ilkeston to sixth in the Northern Premier League Premier Division, ten points off first placed Hednesford Town with two games in hand.

On 18 November 2010, it was announced that Holdsworth had agreed to leave Field Mill by mutual consent after less than two years with the club.

On 24 October 2011, Holdsworth was named Lincoln City manager until the end of the 2011–12 season, replacing Steve Tilson. He left the club by mutual consent on Sunday 17 February 2013, leaving Lincoln 18th in the Conference Premier.

On 14 October 2013, he returned to management with Goole with his former Sheffield United teammate Curtis Woodhouse acting as his assistant. Holdsworth stepped down as Goole manager on 27 January 2014 with Woodhouse taking over the role.

On 3 August 2018, Holdsworth was appointed director of football at Carlisle United. On 23 February 2022, Holdsworth stepped down from this position.

Personal life
His twin brother Dean Holdsworth is also a footballer turned football manager. On 18 September 2010, they became the first twins to manage against each other in the top five divisions of English football, when Dean was manager of Newport County and David manager of Mansfield Town. Newport won the match 1–0.

David Holdsworth's house was featured on an episode of Through the Keyhole.

References

External links

Profile at Post War English & Scottish Football League A–Z Player's Database

1968 births
Living people
People from Walthamstow
Footballers from Walthamstow
English footballers
England under-21 international footballers
Association football defenders
Watford F.C. players
Sheffield United F.C. players
Birmingham City F.C. players
Walsall F.C. players
Bolton Wanderers F.C. players
Scarborough F.C. players
Gretna F.C. players
English Football League players
National League (English football) players
Scottish Football League players
English football managers
Ilkeston Town F.C. managers
Mansfield Town F.C. managers
Lincoln City F.C. managers
Goole A.F.C. managers
National League (English football) managers
English twins
Twin sportspeople